Interstate 481 (I-481) is an auxiliary Interstate Highway that serves as an eastern bypass of Syracuse, New York, in the US. It begins at its parent, I-81, in the city's southern end and travels through the eastern Syracuse suburbs of Jamesville, DeWitt, and Cicero before rejoining I-81 in the suburb of North Syracuse. After crossing I-81 in North Syracuse, I-481 continues northwest to Fulton and Oswego as New York State Route 481 (NY 481). I-481 is part of the Veterans Memorial Highway, which extends northward onto NY 481.

Route description
I-481 begins at I-81's exit 16A, a directional T interchange in the South Valley section of the city of Syracuse. Immediately crossing under NY 173, I-481 proceeds eastward alongside Rock Cut Road (unsigned County Route 103 [CR 103]), which meets the freeway at exit 1 heading east. I-481 crosses out of Syracuse and into the town of Onondaga, paralleling Rock Cut Road into Clark Reservation State Park. The Interstate Highway makes a bend to the northeast, crossing over tracks used by the New York, Susquehanna and Western Railway and entering exit 2, which connects to Jamesville Road (CR 7).

After exit 2, I-481 makes a bend to the north, crossing east of Butternut Creek Golf Course as it crosses into the town of DeWitt. In DeWitt, I-481 enters an interchange (exit 3) with NY 5 and NY 92 (East Genesee Street) just west of the hamlet of Lyndon. After the junction, I-481 continues bending to the northeast, crossing the west end of Old Erie Canal State Park and east of White Chapel Memory Gardens before entering a large interchange with the eastern terminus of I-690. Just north of the interchange, I-481 crosses over NY 290 (Manlius Center Road) and CSX Transportation's DeWitt Yard. A short distance after the railroad, I-481 enters exit 5, which connects to Kirkville Road (CR 53).

After the interchange with CR 53, I-481 continues northward through DeWitt, paralleling Fly Road (CR 77). A short distance later, I-481 crosses over the New York State Thruway (I-90) and enters exit 6, a trumpet interchange leading to exit 34A of the Thruway. A short distance after the Thruway, I-481 enters a partial cloverleaf interchange with NY 298 (Collamer Road). The freeway continues northeast, crossing over East Taft Road (CR 18) in DeWitt before bending northwest into the town of Cicero. In Cicero, I-481 enters an interchange (exit 8) with Northern Boulevard (CR 82). A short distance to the west in the town of North Syracuse, I-481 enters exit 9, a cloverleaf interchange with I-81. At this junction, the designation of I-481 ends while NY 481 continues northwestward toward Oswego.

History
What is now I-481 was originally proposed as parts of two separate highways bypassing the city of Syracuse. From the New York State Thruway (I-90) in DeWitt southwest to I-81 in the south end of Syracuse, the highway was originally designated as I-281. North of the thruway, modern I-481 was initially part of "Relocated Route 57", a proposed limited-access highway extending from NY 57 in Fulton to the thruway in DeWitt via North Syracuse. All of I-281 and the segment of Relocated Route 57 east of I-81 in North Syracuse were redesignated as I-481 on January 1, 1970.

The first section of the highway to be built was the piece between Jamesville Road and NY 5. Work on this portion of the freeway began  and was completed and opened to traffic by 1965. Construction of I-281, and later I-481, initially progressed northward from NY 5. The segment between Lyndon and I-690 was opened to traffic in the early 1970s, while the piece between I-690 and the thruway was completed by 1977. To the southwest, the section of I-481 from I-81 to Jamesville Road was finished in the early 1980s, finally connecting I-481 to its parent. The last portion of the route from the thruway to I-81 in North Syracuse was completed south of NY 298 by 1985 and finished by 1990.

Future
As part of the demolition and replacement of I-81 through Downtown Syracuse, I-481 will be redesignated as I-81, while the current route of I-81 will be redesignated as I-81 Business (I-81 Bus). As part of the project, both interchanges between I-81 and I-481 would be reconstructed. The ramps would be expanded to carry more traffic to account for the increased traffic. Also as part of the project, I-481 would be expanded to three lanes each way between exits 4 (I-690) and 5 (Kirkville Road); to three lanes northbound between exits 5 and 6 (I-90); and to three lanes southbound between exits 9 (I-81) and 8 (Northern Boulevard). Construction was expected to start in mid-2020 and take five years to complete. However, in May 2021, Governor Andrew Cuomo announced the project would not commence until the following year. At this time, the New York state government allocated $800 million to the "community grid" plan. In preparation for the reconstruction/relocation of I-81 around Syracuse, the American Association of State Highway and Transportation Officials (AASHTO), at its annual Spring Meeting in May 2021, conditionally approved the New York State Department of Transportation (NYSDOT)'s application to reroute I-81 over I-481 around the east side of Syracuse and redesignate I-81 through Syracuse as I-81 Bus, pending concurrence from the Federal Highway Administration (FHWA). The I-481 designation will be eliminated once these route changes have been completed.

Exit list

See also

New York State Route 481 for exits 10 through 14

References

External links

81-4
81-4
4
Transportation in Onondaga County, New York
Transportation in Syracuse, New York
Central New York
DeWitt, New York